In enzymology, an UMP kinase is an enzyme that catalyzes the chemical reaction

ATP + UMP  ADP + UDP

Thus, the two substrates of this enzyme are ATP and UMP, whereas its two products are ADP and UDP.

This enzyme belongs to the family of transferases, specifically those transferring phosphorus-containing groups (phosphotransferases) with a phosphate group as acceptor. The systematic name of this enzyme class is ATP:UMP phosphotransferase. Other names in common use include uridylate kinase, UMPK, uridine monophosphate kinase, PyrH, UMP-kinase, and SmbA. This enzyme participates in pyrimidine metabolism.

Structural studies

As of March 2010, 19 structures have been solved for this class of enzymes, and are deposited in the PDB. All have a 3-layer (aba) sandwich) architecture (CATH code 3.40.1160.10).

Search for all UMP Kinases in the PDB using the enzyme Browser at PDBe. (input the EC number)

References

 
 

EC 2.7.4
Enzymes of known structure